Gaodeng Island (Kaoteng, Kao-teng Tao) (Foochow Romanized: Gŏ̤-dĕng-dō̤, also Pei-sha Tao) is an island in the East China Sea, part of Beigan Township, Lienchiang County (the Matsu Islands), Fujian Province, Republic of China (Taiwan). The island is closed to the public. The island can be seen from the nearby Beigan Island and Daqiu Island.

History
In 1368, fisherman residents of the nearby Huangqi Peninsula moved to and lived on the island.

On February 13, 1951, under cover of fog, eight Chinese Communist motorized junks and more than twenty wooden ships surrounded and attacked the island. After two hours of fighting, the Chinese Communist forces were repelled.

In the early morning of November 20, 1954, ROC soldier Wang Hsi-Tien was severely injured while capturing a frogman soldier from mainland China who had landed on the island. Communist soldiers who swim to the islands from the mainland are referred to among the soldiers as 'water goblins'.

On March 4, 1955 during the First Taiwan Strait Crisis, an assault on Kaoteng Island (Gaodeng) by forty Communist motorized junks was driven off.

On the three days of October 7, 11 and 14, 1955, a total of 49 rounds were fired at Kaoteng (Gaodeng) in Chinese Communist shelling of the island. On October 29, 12 rounds were fired at Gaodeng Island from Fenjishan on the Beijiao Peninsula. On December 28, Nationalist and Communist forces clashed for an hour in the waters near Gaodeng Island. There were reports of shelling directed at Kaoteng (Gaodeng) later in the year. On February 3, 1956, Gaodeng Island was shelled over 600 times. On February 9, the island was shelled 154 times. On March 19, the island was shelled 119 times and Nationalist forces returned fire, firing thirteen shells. On April 24, the island was shelled 246 times. On May 17, the island was shelled 136 times.

On August 19, 1958, President Chiang Kai-shek visited the island.

On February 6, 1960, Chinese Communists fired 165 shells at the island. Nationalist forces sustained no injuries.

In September/October 1975, frogmen ('water goblins') from mainland China landed on the island twice and left threatening messages in graffiti.

On December 26, 2000, a Chinese fishing boat was spotted  from Kaoteng Island (Gaodeng). The Coast Guard fired 16 rounds of ammunition into the air as a warning. Six crew members aboard were arrested on the spot and the ship sank into the sea.

On the morning of September 9, 2005, President Chen Shui-bian visited Gaodeng Island and other nearby islands.

In April 2019, a Beigan-registered fishing boat reported that it was attacked and chased off by numerous Chinese boats in Taiwan-controlled waters between Gaodeng and Zhongdao on the afternoon of April 17. The next day, a Taiwan (ROC) Coast Guard vessel was pelted with rocks by the crew of a Chinese ship off the coast of the Matsu Islands.

Geography
Ports include Nan-ao Port, Tiejian Port and Dawei Port.

Gallery

See also
 List of islands in the East China Sea
 List of islands of Taiwan

References

External links
馬祖日報2017/07/22影音／推運補油桶、吃軍用罐頭　高登鐵漢22日回家 ('Matsu Daily July 22, 2017 Recording / Push the oil drum, eat military rations / Gaodeng's Men with Nerves of Steel Return Home on the 22nd') 

Islands of Fujian, Republic of China
Matsu Islands